Strongyli ("round"), also known as Strongylo, is an uninhabited Greek islet, located south of cape Goudero on the coast of Lasithi, eastern Crete, in the Libyan Sea. It forms a close group of islands with Koufonisi, Makroulo, Marmaro, and Trachilos.

See also
List of islands of Greece

Landforms of Lasithi
Uninhabited islands of Crete
Islands of Greece